Hadoard or Hadoardus was a priest and presumed librarian (custos librorum) in Corbie Abbey during the ninth century. He is known for two surviving collectanea, or anthologies of extracts. One of these (now Vatican Reg. lat. 1762) draws primarily from the philosophical works of Cicero. It also contains excerpts from Macrobius and Martianus Capella, as well as an introductory poem of 112 lines that echoes classical poets. A collection of excerpts from St. Augustine and other patristic authorities is preserved in Paris, BnF n.a.l. 13381.

References
 Charles H. Beeson, The Collectaneum of Hadoard, Classical Philology, Vol. 40, No. 4 (Oct., 1945), pp. 201-222
 Charles H. Besson, Lupus of Ferrières and Hadoard, Classical Philology, 43 (1948), 190-91
 Bernhard Bischoff, "Hadoard und die Klassikerhss. aus Corbie", Mittelalterliche Studien 1 (Stuttgart 1966) 49-63
 David Ganz, Corbie in the Carolingian Renaissance (Sigmaringen, 1990), 93-101. 

9th-century Christian clergy
Corbie Abbey